The Greatest Hits Collection is the first greatest hits album by the Canadian country music singer Michelle Wright. It was released on November 2, 1999, on Arista Nashville/BMG Music Canada in Canada. The album has thirteen of Wright's singles and three newly recorded songs.

Track listing
 "New Kind of Love" (Steve Bogard, Rick Giles) - 3:56
 "All You Really Wanna Do" (Bogard, Giles) - 3:18
 "Take It Like a Man" (Tony Haselden) - 3:57
 "He Would Be Sixteen" (Charlie Black, Jill Colucci, Austin Roberts) - 3:43
 "Guitar Talk" (Bogard, Colin Linden) - 3:33
 "Now and Then" (Gary Harrison, Karen Staley) - 3:48
 "One Good Man" (Bogard, Giles) - 3:40
 "Safe in the Arms of Love" (Pat Bunch, Mary Ann Kennedy, Pam Rose) - 3:30
 "Nobody's Girl" (Gretchen Peters) - 3:19
 "What Love Looks Like" (Michelle Wright, Christi Dannemiller, Lisa Drew) - 3:18
 "The Answer Is Yes" (Rodney Crowell) - 3:41
 "People Get Ready" (Curtis Mayfield) - 3:24
 "Your Love" (Jim Brickman, Dave Deviller, Sean Hosein) - 3:41
 "Walkin' After Midnight" (Alan Block, Don Hecht) - 3:26
 duet with Patsy Cline
 previously unreleased
 "When I Found You" (Deviller, Hosein, Wright) - 3:40
 previously unreleased
 "I Surrender" (Eric Silver, Wright) - 3:37
 previously unreleased

Personnel

 John Acosta – background vocals
 Michael Black – background vocals
 Bruce Bouton – steel guitar, Weissenborn
 Spady Brannen – bass guitar
 Jim Brickman – piano
 Mak Casstevens – acoustic guitar, mandolin
 Joe Chemay – bass guitar
 Patsy Cline – duet vocals on "Walkin' After Midnight"
 Lisa Cochran – background vocals
 Dave Deviller – acoustic guitar, programming
 Tabitha Fair – background vocals
 Larry Franklin – fiddle
 Paul Franklin – dobro, steel guitar
 John Gardner – drums
 Sonny Garrish – dobro, steel guitar
 Rick Giles – background vocals
 Mark Hill – bass guitar
 John Hobbs – organ, piano
 Paul Hollowell – keyboards
 Sean Hosein – programming
 Dann Huff – electric guitar
 Paul Leim – drums, percussion
 Terry McMillan – percussion
 Liana Manis – background vocals
 Carl Marsh – Fairlight
 Brent Mason – electric guitar
 Anthony Miracle – drums, keyboards
 Steve Nathan – keyboards, piano
 Brian Newcombe – bass guitar
 Michael Omartian – piano
 Larry Paxton – string arrangements
 Michael Rhodes – bass guitar
 Bill Sample – conductor, string arrangements
 Eric Silver – acoustic guitar, electric guitar, mandolin, background vocals
 Karen Staley – background vocals
 Catherine Styron – keyboards
 Biff Watson – acoustic guitar
 Lari White – background vocals
 Kris Wilkinson – string arrangements, strings
 John Willis – acoustic guitar, electric guitar, mandolin
 Lonnie Wilson – drums, percussion
 Michelle Wright – lead vocals

Chart performance

1999 greatest hits albums
Michelle Wright albums
Arista Records compilation albums